Komaralingam is a panchayat town in Tirupur district in the Indian state of Tamil Nadu.

The town was earlier known as "kumana mangalam "and later "kumana-lingam",named after the chieftain kumanan  who is believed to have ruled the region between palani and udumalapettai

Demographics
 India census, Komaralingam had a population of 11,737. Males constitute 50% of the population and females 50%. Komaralingam has an average literacy rate of 55%, lower than the national average of 59.5%: male literacy is 63%, and female literacy is 47%. In Komaralingam, 11% of the population is under 6 years of age.

References

Tiruppur district